New Jalpaiguri - Ranchi Express is an Express train of the Indian Railways connecting  in Jharkhand and   in Siliguri, West Bengal. It is currently being operated with 18630/18629 train numbers on twice in week basis. The train passes through Jharkhand, Bihar, and West Bengal.

Timings

The train covers total distance of 829 kilometres in 22 hours 15 minutes.

Locomotive
From   to  the train is hauled by WAP-5 /WAP-7 locomotive of Electric Loco Shed, Asansol and vice versa.

Coach Composition
The train contains 6 General Coaches, 1 AC Second Tier, 3 AC Third Tier, 6 Sleeper Coaches and 2 Second Sitting Coaches.

Route
 (Starts)

 (Ends)

Loco Reversal

References

Transport in Ranchi
Transport in Siliguri
Express trains in India
Rail transport in Assam
Rail transport in West Bengal
Rail transport in Jharkhand
Rail transport in Bihar